Antonio Barichievich (October 10, 1925 – September 7, 2003), was a Croatian-Canadian strongman, professional wrestler, and eccentric, better known by his ring name The Great Antonio. He was a popular local figure in Montreal until his death.

Early life 
Barichievich was born Anton Baričević in Zagreb, Kingdom of Serbs, Croats and Slovenes. Biographers have written that he went to work with a pick and shovel at the age of six and was able to uproot trees with a cable around his neck by age 12. Antonio was at the Bagnoli displaced persons camp during World War II. In 1945, he arrived by refugee ship in Halifax, Nova Scotia, Canada. He never discussed his experiences during World War II, but writers speculate that he was psychologically affected by whatever he saw and experienced.

Career

Strongman competitions 
Beginning in the late 1940s, Barichievich began appearing as a strongman in Montreal. He first made it into the Guinness Book of World Records in 1952 by pulling a 433-tonne train 19.8 metres. He later made it into Guinness by pulling four city buses loaded with passengers. He weighed 465 pounds (211 kg) and stood about 6 foot 4 inches (1.93 m). His suits were size 90 and his shoes size 28. He could eat 25 chickens or 10 steaks at one sitting. During the 1970s he toured the world as a strongman and performer, appearing in world capitals and on popular TV variety shows.

Despite his imposing stature, Barichievich is said to have sung with a soft, beautiful voice, and at one time wanted to tour with Tiny Tim. Throughout the 1970s and 1980s, he made increasingly eccentric demands: he said he would pull a Boeing 747 down the tarmac provided Boeing gave him a jet for his own personal use, and he approached Don King saying that he would do a fight film for one million dollars.

Professional wrestling 
In addition to strongman exhibitions, he participated in professional wrestling matches. As a younger wrestler he performed under the names Narcissus or Sweet Narcissus but by the late 1950s he had developed the Great Antonio persona. Barichievich purportedly almost won the Stampede North American Heavyweight Championship in wrestling in Calgary in 1971, but fans nearly rioted at the idea that Antonio, wrestling as a heel at the time, could appear and beat their hometown favorite. His wrestling career continued into New Japan Pro-Wrestling through the 1970s without much success. On December 8, 1977, he lost a notorious match against Antonio Inoki during which Barichievich inexplicably began no-selling Inoki's attacks and then stiffing Inoki; Inoki responded by shooting on Barichievich, knocking him down with palm strikes and kicks, and then stomping him into a bloody mess as he lay on the mat.

Film and television 
Barichievich appeared in several movies, including Quest for Fire and Abominable Snowman. He also appeared in the feature film A 20th Century Chocolate Cake (1983) directed by Lois Siegel. In addition, he made appearances on several television shows, including The Ed Sullivan Show and Johnny Carson's The Tonight Show.

Later life 

As Barichievich grew older, he became a noted eccentric figure in his adopted home town of Montreal. He changed the story of his background on at least two occasions. In one instance, he claimed that, rather than being of Croatian descent, he was Italian. In his later years, he claimed that he was an extraterrestrial. Poor and illiterate, he frequented doughnut shops in Rosemont as well as Berri-UQAM metro station, where he sold postcards of himself and brochures outlining his life story.

Barichievich died in 2003 at the age of 77 of a heart attack while in a grocery store in Montreal. He is believed to have been married at least twice, once in Europe and once in Canada, but he left behind no known descendants on either side. Before his death, he carried "every scrap of paper that had been written about him over the years, news clippings from all over the world, in garbage bags." After his death, discovered among the clippings was a letter from the office of Bill Clinton, and old photos of Barichievich with people including Pierre Trudeau, Liza Minnelli, Lee Majors, Sophia Loren and Johnny Carson.

In 2015, a plaque and bench were dedicated to him in the Rosemont–La Petite-Patrie borough of Montreal, where he had lived the last 20 years of his life in a small apartment. Élise Gravel wrote and illustrated a children's book about Barichievich in 2014. The Barr Brothers reference Barichievich in their track "Song That I Heard" from the 2017 album Queens of the Breakers. In 2008, the Quebecois group Mes Aïeux recorded a song in homage to Barichievich on their album La ligne orange, as well as a recording of a song sung by the strongman himself.

References

External links 

 
 Information about the Great Antonio at the Montreal Mirror
 

1925 births
2003 deaths
Canadian strength athletes
Canadian male film actors
Male actors from Montreal
Male actors from Zagreb
Sportspeople from Zagreb
Yugoslav emigrants to Canada
Stampede Wrestling alumni
Croatian male professional wrestlers
Professional wrestlers from Montreal